The Cleveland Landmarks Commission is responsible for determining whether buildings, sites or historic districts are eligible for designation as landmarks in the city of Cleveland, Ohio. As Cleveland has many historic streets, districts, and buildings the commission is charged with weeding out what buildings, districts, and streets are of definite interest to the people of Cleveland, Ohio and the nation of the United States in general. Two of the oldest buildings in the city that are listed on the Landmarks Commission are the 1824 Dunham Tavern Museum (which is located in the Central neighborhood of the city) and the 1855 Old Stone Church located on Public Square.

The List
This is a partial list of buildings that are listed on the website of the City of Cleveland and that largely already have a presence on Wiki pages. 
The List is broken down by Cleveland neighborhood.

Downtown

East 4th Street District
Caxton Building
Cleveland City Hall 
Cleveland Grays Armory
Cleveland Public Library Main Branch
Cuyahoga County Courthouse 
1717 East Ninth Building
Fenn Tower at Cleveland State University (CSU)
Guardian Bank Building
Mather Mansion at CSU
May Company Building
Old Stone Church
Playhouse Square (Cleveland's Theatre District)
Public Hall (not including the 2013 Huntington Convention Center of Cleveland)
Public Square (Cleveland's central plaza)
Rose Building
St. John's Cathedral (The Roman Catholic Diocese of Cleveland's mother church)
Soldiers and Sailors Monument
Standard Building
Warehouse District

University

Case Western Reserve University (several buildings) 
Church of the Covenant
Cleveland Cultural Gardens in Rockefeller Park 
Cleveland Museum of Art (1916 and 1971 buildings)
Garfield Memorial
Lakeview Cemetery
Little Italy
Severance Hall
Stager-Beckwith Mansion

Ohio City

Carnegie West Branch of Cleveland Public Library 
 Market Square
West Side Market

Tremont

A Christmas Story House
St. Theodosius Russian Orthodox Cathedral

Detroit–Shoreway

Gordon Square

References

Cleveland